In public-key cryptography, Edwards-curve Digital Signature Algorithm (EdDSA) is a digital signature scheme using a variant of Schnorr signature based on twisted Edwards curves.
It is designed to be faster than existing digital signature schemes without sacrificing security. It was developed by a team including Daniel J. Bernstein, Niels Duif, Tanja Lange, Peter Schwabe, and Bo-Yin Yang.
The reference implementation is public domain software.

Summary 
The following is a simplified description of EdDSA, ignoring details of encoding integers and curve points as bit strings; the full details are in the papers and RFC.

An EdDSA signature scheme is a choice:

 of finite field  over odd prime power ;
 of base point  with order ; and

These parameters are common to all users of the EdDSA signature scheme. The security of the EdDSA signature scheme depends critically on the choices of parameters, except for the arbitrary choice of base point—for example, Pollard's rho algorithm for logarithms is expected to take approximately  curve additions before it can compute a discrete logarithm, so  must be large enough for this to be infeasible, and is typically taken to exceed . The hash function  is normally modelled as a random oracle in formal analyses of EdDSA's security. In the HashEdDSA variant, an additional collision-resistant hash function  is needed.

Within an EdDSA signature scheme,

 Public key
 An EdDSA public key is a curve point , encoded in  bits.
 Signature
 An EdDSA signature on a message  by public key  is the pair , encoded in  bits, of a curve point  and an integer  satisfying the following verification equation.  denotes concatenation.

 Private key
 An EdDSA private key is a -bit string  which should be chosen uniformly at random.

Ed25519 
Ed25519 is the EdDSA signature scheme using SHA-512 (SHA-2) and Curve25519 where

 
  is the twisted Edwards curve

  and 
 "positive" coordinates are even coordinates (least significant bit is cleared)
 "negative" coordinates are odd coordinates (least significant bit is set)

The curve  is birationally equivalent to the Montgomery curve known as Curve25519. The equivalence is

Performance 
The original team has optimized Ed25519 for the x86-64 Nehalem/Westmere processor family. Verification can be performed in batches of 64 signatures for even greater throughput. Ed25519 is intended to provide attack resistance comparable to quality 128-bit symmetric ciphers. Public keys are 256 bits long and signatures are 512 bits long.

Secure coding 
As security features, Ed25519 does not use branch operations and array indexing steps that depend on secret data, so as to defeat many side channel attacks.

Like other discrete-log-based signature schemes, EdDSA uses a secret value called a nonce unique to each signature.  In the signature schemes DSA and ECDSA, this nonce is traditionally generated randomly for each signature—and if the random number generator is ever broken and predictable when making a signature, the signature can leak the private key, as happened with the Sony PlayStation 3 firmware update signing key.
In contrast, EdDSA chooses the nonce deterministically as the hash of a part of the private key and the message. Thus, once a private key is generated, EdDSA has no further need for a random number generator in order to make signatures, and there is no danger that a broken random number generator used to make a signature will reveal the private key.

Standardization and implementation inconsistencies 
Note that there are two standardization efforts for EdDSA, one from IETF, an informational  and one from NIST as part of FIPS 186-5. The differences between the standards have been analyzed, and test vectors are available.

Software 
Notable uses of Ed25519 include OpenSSH, GnuPG and various alternatives, and the signify tool by OpenBSD. Usage of Ed25519 (and Ed448) in the SSH protocol has been standardized. In 2019 a draft version of the FIPS 186-5 standard included deterministic Ed25519 as an approved signature scheme.

 Apple Watch and iPhone use Ed25519 keys for IKEv2 mutual authentication
 Botan
 CryptoNote cryptocurrency protocol
 Dropbear SSH
 I2Pd implementation of EdDSA
 Java Development Kit 15
 Libgcrypt
 Minisign and Minisign Miscellanea for macOS
 NaCl / libsodium
 OpenSSL 1.1.1
 Python - A slow but concise alternate implementation, does not include side-channel attack protection 
 Supercop reference implementation (C language with inline assembler)
 Virgil PKI uses Ed25519 keys by default
 wolfSSL

Ed448 
It has also been approved in the draft of the FIPS 186-5 standard.

References

External links 
 Ed25519 home page

Public-key cryptography
Elliptic curve cryptography
Digital signature schemes
Public-domain software with source code